Hither Green (London) Traction Maintenance Depot or Hither Green (London) TMD is a railway depot used for the maintenance and servicing of freight trains adjacent to the Hither Green marshalling yard.  The depot is a hub for moving freight around southeast England. Hither Green TMD is owned and operated by DBS.  The official depot code is HG.  In steam days the shed code was 73C.

The depot is situated south of Lewisham, to the southeast of Hither Green station between the railway station and Lee station on the Sidcup line and between Hither Green station and Grove Park station on the Orpington line.

Motive power depot
 

A modern concrete-fabricated motive power depot was opened by the Southern Railway on 10 September 1933 to service its new marshalling yard at Hither Green. Facilities included a coal stage line and a turntable. It was principally as a freight depot with, responsible for cross-London transfer freights and received a batch of SR W class 2-6-4 tank engines for this purpose.

During the 1950s the depot also began to acquire a number of diesel shunters of the 08 and 09 classes It ceased to service steam locomotives in October 1961, but the buildings continued in use to service diesel locomotives.

Traction maintenance depot
The buildings became a traction maintenance depot. Half of the original engine shed was demolished in 1993, but the remains were modernized with the original locomotive turntable still in existence.

In 1982 the depot became part of Railfreight. It became part of English Welsh & Scottish Railway (EWS) in February 1996. The former British Rail Civil Mechanical & Electrical Engineering department (CM&EE), which had been based here since 1991, became part of Balfour Beatty.  A new structure for housing Balfour Beatty's maintenance stock was opened in December 1997.

Allocation
Between 1959 and 1962, ninety eight Type 3 British Rail Class 33 were allocated to the depot. Many of these were subsequently transferred to Eastleigh but in 1979 there remained forty-five members of the class. In 1980 the depot had an allocation of forty-two Class 33, five class 08 and four class 09. The class 33 began to be phased out in 1990 and were completely withdrawn by 1998 when the depot lost its permanent locomotive allocation.

Frequent visitors to the depot during the 1970s and 1980s were British Rail Class 73 Electro-diesels, Class 47s and 56s together with  occasional visits by British Rail Class 25, British Rail Class 31 and British Rail Class 37 diesels. Some Class 31 were displaced from Toton and temporarily transferred to Hither Green to work engineers' trains, but these were withdrawn in 2001. Likewise British Rail Class 58 were transferred in 2001 until their withdrawal on 2 September 2002.

Regularly seen at Hither Green TMD are:
 Class 59/0 diesel locomotives owned by Foster Yeoman and operated by Mendip Rail (numbered 59001-59005 excluding 59003).
 Class 59/1 diesel locomotives owned by Hanson plc and operated by Mendip Rail (numbered 59101-59104).
 Class 59/2 diesel locomotives owned and operated by DBS (numbered 59201-59206).
Class 66 diesel locomotives owned and operated by DBS (numbered 66001-66250).
 The Structure Gauging Train top & tailed by various locomotive traction and DVTs.

Also nearby is Grove Park Depot and Sidings operated by Southeastern Trains. This provides traincrew and stabling for some of Southeastern's Electric Multiple Unit fleet. Located next to the Up sidings there is the Grove Park Safety Training Centre accessed from Brownhill Road (A205 South Circular) in Catford.

The Hither Green derailment happened just outside Hither Green TMD on the railway line between Hither Green and Grove Park stations.

The drivers and locomotive involved in the Eltham (Well Hall) derailment were allocated from Hither Green TMD.

References

Further reading

External links

Railway depots in London
Transport in the London Borough of Lewisham